The 2022 Bury Metropolitan Borough Council election took place on 5 May 2022. Due to boundary changes, all 51 councillors were elected at the same time. The election took place alongside other local elections across the United Kingdom.

In the previous council election in 2021, Labour maintained its control of the council, holding 27 seats after the election. The Conservatives formed the main opposition with fifteen seats, with the Liberal Democrats and Radcliffe First both on four councillors and a single independent.

Background 

The Local Government Act 1972 created a two-tier system of metropolitan counties and districts covering Greater Manchester, Merseyside, South Yorkshire, Tyne and Wear, the West Midlands, and West Yorkshire starting in 1974. Bury was a district of the Greater Manchester metropolitan county. The Local Government Act 1985 abolished the metropolitan counties, with metropolitan districts taking on most of their powers as metropolitan boroughs. The Greater Manchester Combined Authority was created in 2011 and began electing the mayor of Greater Manchester from 2017, which was given strategic powers covering a region coterminous with the former Greater Manchester metropolitan county.

Since its formation, Bury has variously been under Labour control, Conservative control and no overall control. Councillors have predominantly been elected from the Labour Party and the Conservative Party, with some Liberal Democrat and independent councillors also serving. The council has had an overall Labour majority since the 2011 election, in which Labour made six gains to hold 29 of the 51 seats. The Conservatives held 17 and the Liberal Democrats held five. Labour continued to make gains until 2015, after which the party has gradually lost seats whilst maintaining its majority. In the most recent election in 2021, Labour won nine seats with 41.7% of the vote, the Conservatives won seven seats with 41.1% of the vote, Radcliffe First won two seats with 5.5% of the vote and the Liberal Democrats won one with 8.1% of the vote.

The Conservative Member of Parliament (MP) for Bury South, Christian Wakeford, defected to the Labour Party in January 2022. On the same day, Gareth Staples-Jones, an independent councillor who had been elected as Radcliffe First, also joined the Labour Party.

Bury Council underwent boundary changes ahead of this election. The Local Government Boundary Commission for England determined that the council should continue to elect 51 councillors and designed new election boundaries to reflect population change. The new boundaries include seventeen three-member wards.

Electoral process 

The council generally elects its councillors in thirds, with a third being up for election every year for three years, with no election in the fourth year. However, due to a boundary review, all fifty-one councillors were elected at the same time. The election used plurality block voting, with each ward electing three councillors. Electors were able to vote for up to three candidates, and the three candidates with the most votes in each ward were elected.

All registered electors (British, Irish, Commonwealth and European Union citizens) living in Bury aged 18 or over were entitled to vote in the election. People who live at two addresses in different councils, such as university students with different term-time and holiday addresses, were entitled to be registered for and vote in elections in both local authorities. Voting in-person at polling stations took place from 07:00 to 22:00 on election day, and voters were able to apply for postal votes or proxy votes in advance of the election.

Previous council composition

Results summary

Results 
Statements of persons nominated were published on 6 April. Incumbent councillors are marked with an asterisk (*).

Besses

Bury East

Bury West

Elton

Holyrood

Moorside

North Manor

Pilkington Park

Radcliffe East

Radcliffe North & Ainsworth

Radcliffe West

Ramsbottom

Redvales

St. Marys

Sedgley

Tottington

Unsworth

References 

Bury Council elections
Bury